Memet-Abdulla Ezmat (born 21 November 1997) is a Chinese footballer who plays as a forward for Nantong Zhiyun.

Club career
Memet-Abdulla Ezmat was promoted to the senior team of Qingdao Huanghai within the 2019 China League One season and would make his debut in a league game on 16 March 2019 against Shaanxi Chang'an Athletic F.C. in a 3-0 defeat. After that game he would become a regular member of the team that would go on to win the division and promotion into the top tier.

Career statistics

Honours

Club
Qingdao Huanghai
China League One: 2019

References

External links

1997 births
Living people
Chinese footballers
China League One players
Chinese Super League players
Qingdao F.C. players
Association football forwards